William Casey was an American bobsledder who competed in the late 1940s. He won the gold medal in the four-man event at the 1949 FIBT World Championships in Lake Placid, New York.

References

Sport: The Secret of Shady Corner  TIME, March 7, 1949. Retrieved 7 September 2007.

American male bobsledders
Possibly living people
Year of birth missing